This is a list of major award wins and nominations given to American Idol contestants.

Season 1

Kelly Clarkson

ASCAP Pop Music Awards
2004: Song Writer Award – "Miss Independent": won
2007:
Song of The Year Award – "Because of You": won
Most Performed Songs of The Year:  won
2010: Most Performed Songs of The Year: won
ACM Awards
2008: Vocal Event of the Year – "Because of You" : nominated
2012:
Single of the Year – "Don't You Wanna Stay" : won
Vocal Event of the Year – "Don't You Wanna Stay" : won
2013: Vocal Event of the Year – "Don't Rush" : nominated
2019: Music Event of the Year – "Keeping Score" : nominated
American Country Awards
2011: 
Single of the Year: Vocal Collaboration – "Don't You Wanna Stay" : won
Music Video: Duo, Group, or Collaboration – "Don't You Wanna Stay": won
American Music Awards
2003: Favorite Pop/Rock New Artist: nominated
2005: 
Favorite Pop/Rock Album – Breakaway: nominated
Favorite Pop/Rock Female Artist: nominated
T-Mobile Text-In Award (Artist of the Year): won
Favorite Adult Contemporary Artist: won
2006: 
Favorite Adult Contemporary Artist: won
Favorite Pop/Rock Female Artist: won
2012: 
Favorite Pop/Rock Female Artist: nominated
Favorite Adult Contemporary Artist: nominated
Billboard Awards
2005: Hot 100 Artist of the Year: nominated
Female Billboard 200 Female: nominated
Hot 100 Song of the Year – "Since U Been Gone": nominated
Hot 100 Airplay of the Year – "Since U Been Gone": nominated
Hot Digital Song – "Since U Been Gone": nominated
BRIT Awards
2006: Best Pop Act: nominated
Best International Female Artist: nominated
Country Music Association Awards
2007: Musical Event of the Year – "Because of You" : nominated
2011: Single of the Year – "Don't You Wanna Stay" : nominated
Musical Event of the Year – "Don't You Wanna Stay" : won
2012: Female Vocalist of the Year: nominated
2013:
Female Vocalist of the Year: nominated
Musical Event of the Year – "Don't Rush": nominated
CMT Music Awards
2008: Collaborative Video of the Year – "Because of You" : nominated
2011: Collaborative Video of the Year – "Don't You Wanna Stay" : nominated
2012: Collaborative Video of the Year – "Don't Rush" : nominated
Critics' Choice Real TV Awards
2022: Female Star of the Year: nominated 
Critics' Choice Television Award
2020: Best Talk Show – The Kelly Clarkson Show: nominated 
2021: Best Talk Show – The Kelly Clarkson Show: nominated   
2022: Best Talk Show – The Kelly Clarkson Show: nominated   
2023: Best Talk Show – The Kelly Clarkson Show: nominated  
Daytime Emmy Awards
2020: Outstanding Talk Show Entertainment – The Kelly Clarkson Show: nominated 
Outstanding Entertainment Talk Show Host: won
2021: Outstanding Talk Show Entertainment – The Kelly Clarkson Show: won
Outstanding Entertainment Talk Show Host: won
Outstanding Original Song – "Cabana Boy Troy": nominated 
2022: Outstanding Talk Show Entertainment – The Kelly Clarkson Show: won
Outstanding Entertainment Talk Show Host: won
Dorian Awards
2016: TV Musical Performance of the Year –  "Piece By Piece": nominated 
Echo Awards
2007: Best International Pop/Rock Female Artist: 
GLAAD Media Award
2023: Outstanding Variety or Talk Show Episode – The Kelly Clarkson Show: pending 
Golden Raspberry Awards
2003: Worst Actress – From Justin to Kelly: nominated 
Worst Screen Couple – From Justin to Kelly : nominated
Gracie Awards
2022: Best Talk Show: Entertainment – The Kelly Clarkson Show: won
Grammy Awards
2004: Best Female Pop Vocal Performance – "Miss Independent": nominated
2006: Best Pop Album -Breakaway: won
Best Female Pop Vocal Performance – "Since U Been Gone": won
2008: Best Country Collaboration – "Because of You" : nominated
2010: Best Pop Album – All I Ever Wanted: nominated
2012: Best Country Duo/Group Performance – "Don't You Wanna Stay" : nominated
2013: Record of the Year – "Stronger (What Doesn't Kill You)": nominated
Best Pop Solo Vocal Performance – "Stronger (What Doesn't Kill You)": nominated
Best Pop Vocal Album – Stronger: won
2014: Best Country Duo or Group Performance – "Don't Rush" : nominated
2016: Best Pop Solo Vocal Performance – "Heartbeat Song": nominated
Best Pop Vocal Album – Piece by Piece: nominated
2017: Best Pop Solo Performance – "Piece by Piece (Idol Version)": nominated
2018: Best Pop Solo Performance – "Love So Soft": nominated 
2019: Best Pop Vocal Album – Meaning of Life: nominated 
2023: Best Traditional Pop Vocal Album – When Christmas Comes Around...: nominated
iHeartRadio Music Awards
2016: Best Cover Song – "Bitch Better Have My Money": nominated
2017: Best Cover Song – "Love on the Brain": nominated 
International Dance Music Awards
2006: Best Pop Dance Track – "Since U Been Gone": nominated
Juno Awards
2006: International Album of the Year: "Breakaway": nominated
LOS40 Music Awards
2006: Best International New Artist: nominated 
Los Premios MTV Latinoamérica
2005: Best International Pop Artist: nominated 
Best New International Artist: nominated 
2006: Best International Pop Artist: nominated 
Meteor Ireland Music Awards
2006: Best International Female: nominated 
MTV Asia Awards
2006: Favorite Female Artist: won
MTV Australian Video Music Awards
2006: Best Female Artist: nominated 
Best Pop Video – "Because of You": pending 
MTV Movie & TV Awards
2022: Best Talk/Topical Show – The Kelly Clarkson Show: nominated  
Best Host: won
MTV Video Music Awards
2003: Best Pop Video – "Miss Independent": nominated
Best New Artist – "Miss Independent": nominated
Viewer's Choice Award – "Miss Independent": nominated
2005: Best Female Video – "Since U Been Gone": won
Best Pop Video – "Since U Been Gone": won
Viewer's Choice Award – "Since U Been Gone": nominated
2006: Best Female Video – "Because of You": won
Viewer's Choice Award – "Because of You": nominated
2009: Best Female Video – "My Life Would Suck Without You": nominated
2012: Best Video with a Message – "Dark Side": nominated 
2013: Best Video with a Social Message – "People Like Us": nominated
MTV Video Music Awards Latin America
2005: Best New International Artist: nominated
Best International Pop Artist: nominated
2006: Best International Artist: nominated
MuchMusic Video Awards
2006: Best International Video – "Behind These Hazel Eyes": nominated
2009: Best International Video – "My Life Would Suck Without You": nominated
2011: International Video of the Year – "Stronger (What Doesn't Kill You)": nominated
Most streamed Video of the Year – "Mr. Know It All": nominated
People's Choice: Favorite International Artist – "Because of You": won
Nickelodeon Kids' Choice Awards
2006: Favorite Female Singer: won
2019: Favorite TV Judges – The Voice: nominated 
Nickelodeon HALO Awards
2017: HALO Hall of Fame: won
OFM Awards
2016: International Song of the Year:  – "Second Hand Heart" : won
People's Choice Awards
2006: Favorite Female Performer: won
2006: Best Smile: won
2016: Favorite Pop Artist: nominated
2020: The Daytime Talk Show of 2020 – The Kelly Clarkson Show: nominated 
2021: The Daytime Talk Show of 2021 – The Kelly Clarkson Show: nominated  
2022: The Daytime Talk Show of 2022 – The Kelly Clarkson Show: won
Pollstar Awards
2008: Most Creative Tour Package – 2 Worlds 2 Voices Tour: nominated 
Premios Oye!
2006: English Song of the Year – "Because of You": nominated
Queerty Awards
2013: Anthem of the Year - "People Like Us": nominated
Radio Disney Music Awards
2003: Best Song That Makes You Turn Up the Radio – "Miss Independent": nominated
Best Video That Rocks – "Miss Independent": nominated
Best Song to Sing Hairbrush Karaoke – "Miss Independent": won
2004: Best Homework Song: – "Breakaway": nominated
Best Song to Air Guitars – "Breakaway": nominated
Best Video That Rocks – "Breakaway": nominated
2006: Best Female Artist: nominated 
Best Song You've Heard a Million Times and Still Love – "Since U Been Gone": won
2007: Best Female Artist: nominated
Best Top 40 Artist: nominated 
Best Song to Dance to – "Never Again": nominated
Best Song to Wake Up to – "Never Again": nominated
Best Song to Sing to an Ex – "Never Again": nominated
2018: Icon Award: won
Radio Music Awards
2003: Song Of The Year / Top 40 Radio – "Miss Independent": nominated
Best Driving Song – "Miss Independent": nominated
2005: Song Of The Year / Adult Hit Radio – "Breakaway": nominated
Song Of The Year / Mainstream Hit Radio – "Since U Been Gone": nominated
Song Of The Year / Mainstream Hit Radio – "Behind These Hazel Eyes": nominated
Artist Of The Year / Mainstream Hit Radio: won
The Record of the Year
2005: Choice Love Song: "Since U Been Gone": : nominated
Teen Choice Awards
2003: Choice Love Song: "A Moment Like This": nominated
Choice Breakout Artist: nominated
Choice Female Music Artist: won
Choice Music Crossover: nominated
Choice Movie Chemistry for From Justin to Kelly: nominated
Choice Breakout Female Actress for From Justin to Kelly: nominated
2005: Choice Album – Breakaway: won
Choice Female Artist: won
Choice Single -"Since U Been Gone": won
Choice Summer Song – "Behind These Hazel Eyes": won
2006: Choice Female Artist: won
Choice Music Single – "Walk Away": nominated
2007: Choice Payback Song – "Never Again": nominated
2009: Choice Music Single – "My Life Would Suck Without You": nominated
2010: Choice Idol Alum: nominated
2012: Choice Music Single: Female – "Stronger (What Doesn't Kill You)": nominated
Choice Break Up Song – "Stronger (What Doesn't Kill You)": nominated
2015: Choice Music Single: Female – "Heartbeat Song: nominated
2018: Choice TV Personality – The Voice: nominated
2019: Choice Movie Song – "Broken & Beautiful": nominated 
TMF Awards (Belgium)
2006: Best Pop International: won
Best Female Pop International: won
TRL Awards
2006: TRL's 1st Lady: nominated
Countdown Killer: won
XM Nation Music Awards
2005: Dashboard Anthem Best Pop Sing-Along – "Since U Been Gone": nominated
Pop Artist of the Year: nominated 
World Music Awards
2003: Best New Female Artist: nominated
2005: World's Best-Selling Pop Female Artist: nominated
2013: World's Best Female Artist: nominated
World's Best Entertainer of the Year: nominated
Women's World Award
2009: World Entertainment Award: won

Tamyra Gray
Teen Choice Awards
2003: Tamyra Gray: Choice Female Television Breakout Star for Boston Public: nominated

Season 2

Ruben Studdard

American Music Awards
2004: Favorite Male R&B Artist: nominated
BET Awards
2004:
Best Male R&B Artist: nominated
Best New Artist: nominated
2005: Best Gospel Artist: nominated
Billboard Music Awards
2003:
Top R&B/Hip-Hop Sales Single – "Superstar/Flying Without Wings"
Top Gospel Artist
Top Gospel Album  – I Need an Angel
Grammy Awards
2004: Best Male R&B Vocal Performance – "Superstar": nominated
Image Awards
2004:
Outstanding Male Artist: nominated
Outstanding New Artist: won
Soul Train Awards
2004: Best New R&B/Soul or Rap New Artist: "Superstar": nominated
Teen Choice Awards
2003: Choice Male Reality/Variety Star for American Idol: won

Clay Aiken

American Music Awards
2004:
Favorite Pop/Rock Male Artist: nominated
Fan Choice Award: won
American Christian Music Awards
2005: Outstanding Yule CD – Merry Christmas with Love: won
Billboard Awards
2003: Best Selling Single of 2003 – "Bridge over Troubled Water/This Is the Night"
2004: Best Selling Christmas Album – Merry Christmas with Love
2005: Best Selling Christian Album – Merry Christmas with Love
Teen Choice Awards
2003: Choice Male Reality/Variety Star for American Idol: nominated

Kimberley Locke
Teen Choice Awards
2003: Choice Female Reality/Variety Star for American Idol: nominated

Josh Gracin
Academy of Country Music
2005: Top New Vocalist: nominated
CMT Music Awards
2005: Breakthrough Video of the Year – "I Want to Live": nominated

Carmen Rasmussen
New Music Weekly Awards
2005: Carmen Rasmusen: New Country Artist of the Year: won

Kimberly Caldwell
Teen Choice Awards
2003: Choice Female Reality/Variety Star for American Idol: nominated

Season 3

Fantasia Barrino

American Music Awards
2005:
Favorite Female R&B Artist: nominated
Favorite R&B/Soul Album – Free Yourself: nominated
2007: Favorite Female R&B Artist: nominated
BET Awards
2005:
Best New Artist: nominated
Best Female R&B Artist: nominated
Billboard Awards
2004:
Top Hot 100 Single Sales – "I Believe"
Top R&B/Hip-Hop Sales Single – "I Believe"
2005:
Top New R&B/Hip-Hop Artist
Top Hot Adult R&B Artist
Grammy Awards
2006:
Best Female R&B Vocal Performance – "Free Yourself": nominated
Best R&B Album – Free Yourself: Nominated
Best Traditional R&B Vocal Performance – "Summertime": nominated
2008:
Best Female R&B Vocal Performance – "When I See U": nominated
Best Contemporary R&B Album – Fantasia: nominated
2009: Best R&B Performance By A Duo Or Group With Vocals – "I'm His Only Woman" : nominated
2011:
Best R&B Album –Back to Me: nominated
Best R&B Vocal Performance – "Bittersweet": won
2014:
Best Urban Contemporary Album – Side Effects Of You nominated
Best R&B Song – "Without Me" (featuring Kelly Rowland and Missy Elliott)": nominated
Best Traditional R&B Performance – "Get It Right": nominated
2017: Best Traditional R&B Performance – "Sleeping with the One I Love": nominated
Image Awards
2005: Outstanding Female Artist: won
2007:
Outstanding Female Artist: nominated
Outstanding Actress in a Mini-Series/T.V. Movie – The Fantasia Barrino Story: Life Is Not a Fairytale: nominated
Outstanding Duo, Group or Collaboration – "Put You Up On Game": nominated
2009:
Outstanding Duo, Group or Collaboration – "I'm His Only Woman" : nominated
2011: NAACP Image Award for Best R&B Song – "Bittersweet": won
Soul Train Awards
2005: Best New R&B/Soul or Rap Artist – "I Believe": nominated
2006: Best Female R&B/Soul Album – Free Yourself: nominated
2010:
Record of the Year – "Bittersweet": nominated
Best Female R&B Soul Artist" nominated
Teen Choice Awards
2004: Choice Female Reality/Variety Star for American Idol: nominated
2005:
Choice Female Breakout Artist:: nominated
Choice R&B Artist: nominated
Theatre World Award
2007: Outstanding Broadway Debut Performance – "The Color Purple": won
Vibe Music Awards
2005: R&B Voice of the Year: nominated

Jasmine Trias
MTV Pilipinas
2006: Favorite Hip-Hop/R&B Video – "Lose Control": nominated

LaToya London
NAACP Theater Awards
2008: Best Supporting Female – Equity, The Color Purple: nominated

Jennifer Hudson
 

Academy Awards
2007: Best Supporting Actress – Dreamgirls: won
BAFTA
2007: Actress in a Supporting Role – Dreamgirls: won
BET Awards
2007:
Best New Artist: won
Best Actress: won
Best Female R&B Artist: nominated
2009:
Best Actress: nominated
Best Female R&B Artist: nominated
2011: Best Female R&B Artist: nominated
Billboard Awards
2012: Top R&B Album – I Remember Me: nominated
Black Reel Awards
2006:
Best Supporting Actress: Dreamgirls: won
Best Breakthrough Performance: Dreamgirls: won
2008:
Best Ensemble – The Secret Life of Bees: nominated
Best Actress – The Secret Life of Bees: nominated
GLAAD Media Awards
2023: Outstanding Variety or Talk Show Episode – The Jennifer Hudson Show: pending 
Golden Globes
2007:
Best Supporting Actress in a Motion Picture – Dreamgirls: won
Best Motion Picture (starring role) – Dreamgirls: won
Grammy Awards
2008: Best Original Soundtrack – Dreamgirls: nominated
2009:
Best Female R&B Vocal Performance – "Spotlight": nominated
Best R&B Album – Jennifer Hudson: won
Best R&B Performance By A Duo Or Group With Vocals – "I'm His Only Woman" : nominated
2015: Best R&B Performance – "It's Your World": nominated
2017: Best Musical Theater Album – The Color Purple: won
Grio Awards
2022:Trailblazer Icon Award: pending 
NAACP Image Awards
2007: Best Supporting Actress in a Movie – Dreamgirls: won
2009:
Outstanding New Artist: won
Outstanding Supporting Actress in a Movie – "The Secret Life of Bees": nominated
Outstanding Female Artist: nominated
Outstanding Duo, Group or Collaboration – "I'm His Only Woman" : nominated
Outstanding Music Video – "Spotlight": nominated
Outstanding Song – "Spotlight": nominated
Outstanding Album: Jennifer Hudson: won
2012:
Outstanding Female Artist: nominated
Outstanding Album – I Remember Me: won
Outstanding Music Video – "Where You At": won
2014: Outstanding Actress in a Motion Picture – Winnie Mandela: nominated
2015: Outstanding Female Artist: nominated
2015: Outstanding Album – J-Hud: nominated
2016: Outstanding Supporting Actress in a Motion Picture – "Chi-Raq": nominated
2022: Entertainer of the Year: won
Outstanding Actress in a Motion Picture – Respect: won
2023: Outstanding Host in a Talk or News / Information (Series or Special): pending
MTV Movie Awards
2007: Best Performance – Dreamgirls: nominated
Nickelodeon Kids' Choice Awards
2019: Favorite TV Judges – The Voice: nominated
People's Choice Awards
2010: Choice R&B Artist: nominated
2014: Favorite Humanitarian: won 
2015: Choice R&B Artist: nominated
2022: The Daytime Talk Show of 2022 – The Jennifer Hudson Show: nominated 
Satellite Awards
2007: Best Actress in a Supporting Role – Dreamgirls: won
Screen Actors Guild Awards
2007:
Outstanding Ensemble in a Motion Picture – Dreamgirls: nominated
Outstanding Supporting Actress in a Motion Picture – Dreamgirls: won
Soul Train Awards
2009:
Best R&B/Soul Female: nominated
Song of the Year – "Spotlight": nominated
Teen Choice Awards
2007: Choice Breakout Film Actress -Dreamgirls: nominated
Choice Film Actress Drama/Adventure – Dreamgirls: won
2009: Choice Music R&B Artist: nominated
Choice Music R&B Single – "If It Isn't Love": nominated
2010: Choice American Idol Alum: nominated
Tony Awards
2022: Best Musical – A Strange Loop: won

Season 4

Carrie Underwood

ACM Awards
2006: Top Female Vocalist: nominated
Top New Female Vocalist: won
Single Record of the Year – "Jesus, Take the Wheel": won
2007: Single Record of the Year – "Before He Cheats":  nominated
Song of the Year – "Before He Cheats": nominated
Album of the Year – Some Hearts: won
Top Female Vocalist: won
Video of the Year – "Before He Cheats": won
2008: Top Female Vocalist: won
2009: Entertainer of the Year: won
Top Female Vocalist: won
Video of the Year –  "Just a Dream": nominated
Album of the Year – Carnival Ride: nominated
2010: Entertainer of the Year: won
Triple Crown Award: won
Top Female Vocalist:  nominated
Song of the Year (as artist and composer) – "Cowboy Casanova": nominated
Album of the Year – Play On, nominated
Vocal Event of the Year – "I Told You So : nominated
2012: Top Female Vocalist: nominated
Vocal Event of the Year – "Remind Me" : nominated
2013: Top Female Vocalist: nominated
Album of the Year: Blown Away: nominated
2014: Female Vocalist of the Year: nominated
Gene Weed Special Achievement Award: won
Video of the Year – "Two Black Cadillacs": nominated
2015: Female Vocalist of the Year: nominated
Vocal Event of the Year – "Somethin' Bad" : nominated
Video of the Year – "Somethin' Bad" : nominated
2016: Female Vocalist of the Year: nominated
2017: Entertainer of the Year: nominated 
Female Vocalist of the Year: nominated 
2018: Female Vocalist of the Year: nominated 
Vocal Event of the Year – "The Fighter" : won
2019: Female Vocalist of the Year: nominated 
2020: Entertainer of the Year: won 
Female Vocalist of the Year: nominated 
2021: Musical Event of the Year – "Hallelujah" : nominated
2022: Entertainer of the Year: pending 
Single of the Year – "If I Didn’t Love You" — : pending 
Video of the Year – "If I Didn’t Love You" — : pending 
Music Event of the Year – "If I Didn’t Love You" — : pending 
American Country Awards
2010: Artist of the Year: won
Female Artist of the Year: won
Touring Artist of the Year – Play On Tour: won
Female Single of the Year – "Cowboy Casanova": won
Female Video of the Year – "Cowboy Casanova": won
Album of the Year – Play On: won
2011: Female Artist of the Year: won
Touring Artist of the Year: nominated
Female Single of the Year – "Mama's Song": won
Female Music Video of the Year – "Mama's Song": won
2012: Female Artist of the Year: won
Single by a Female Artist – "Good Girl": nominated
Single by a Vocal Collaboration – "Remind Me" : won
Music Video by a Female Artist – "Good Girl": nominated
2013: Female Artist of the Year: nominated
Touring Artist of the Year – Blown Away Tour: nominated
Female Single of the Year – "Two Black Cadillacs: nominated
Female Music Video of the Year – "Blown Away": won
American Music Awards
2006: Favorite Female Country Artist: nominated
Breakthrough Artist Award: won
2007: Artist of the Year: won
Favorite Female Country Artist: won
Favorite Country Album – Some Hearts: won
2008: Favorite Female Country Artist: nominated
Favorite Country Album –  Carnival Ride: won
2009: Favorite Female Country Artist: nominated
Favorite Female Country Artist: nominated
Favorite Country Album – Play On: won
2012: Favorite Female Country Artist: nominated
Favorite Country Album – Blown Away: won
2013: Favorite Female Country Artist: nominated
2014: Favorite Female Country Artist: won
2015: Favorite Female Country Artist: won
2016: Artist of the Year: nominated 
Favorite Female Country Artist: won
Favorite Country Album – Storyteller: won
2017: Favorite Female Country Artist: won
2018: Favorite Female Country Artist: won
2019: Favorite Female Country Artist: won
Favorite Country Album – Cry Pretty: won
2021: Favorite Female Country Artist: won
Favorite Inspirational Artist: won
2022: Favorite Female Country Artist: nominated  
Favorite Country Album – Denim & Rhinestones: nominated  
Billboard Music Awards
2005: Top Hot 100 Single Sales – "Independence Day/Inside Your Heaven": won
2006: Top Billboard 200 Album – Some Hearts: won
Top Country Album – Some Hearts: won
Top Country Album Artist (Female): won
Top New Country Artist: won
Top Hot Country Sales Artist: won
Top Country Artist – Female (Singles & Albums): won
Top Billboard 200 Album Artist: won
2007: Top Billboard 200 Artist- Female: won
Top Country Album – Some Hearts: won
Top Country Album Artist (Female): won
Top Country Artist- Female (Singles & Albums): won'
Top Country Artist: won
2008: Top Hot Country Songs Artist: won
2013: Top Country Artist: nominated
Top Country Album – Blown Away: nominated
2014: Milestone Award": won
2015: Top Christian Song – "Something in the Water": won
2016: Top Country Artist: nominated
2016: Top Country Album - Storyteller: nominated
2021: Top Female Country Artist  nominated
Top Country Album - My Gift: nominated 
Top Christian Album - My Gift: won
Top Christian Artist — nominated 
2022: Top Female Country Artist: pending 
Top Country Song – "If I Didn't Love You" 
Top Christian Artist: pending 
Top Christian Album – My Gift: pending 
CMT Music Awards
2006: Breakthrough Video of the Year – "Jesus Take the Wheel": won
Female Video of the Year -"Jesus Take the Wheel": won
Most Inspiring Video – "Jesus Take the Wheel": nominated
2007: Video of the Year – "Before He Cheats": won
Female Video of the Year – "Before He Cheats": won
2008: Video of the Year – "Wasted": nominated
Female Video of the Year – "Wasted": nominated
2009: Video of the Year – "Just A Dream": nominated
2010: Video of the Year – "Cowboy Casanova": won
CMT Performance of the Year – "Temporary Home" from CMT: Invitational Only: won
Female Video of the Year – "Cowboy Casanova": nominated
2011: Video of the Year – "Undo It" nominated
Female Video of the Year – "Undo It": nominated
2012: Video of the Year – "Good Girl": won
Video of the Year – "Remind Me" : nominated
Female Video of the Year – "Good Girl": nominated
Collaborative Video of the Year – "Remind Me" : won
CMT Performance of the Year – "Just a Dream"/"Dream On" : nominated
2013: Video of the Year: – "Blown Away": won
 Female Video of the Year – "Two Black Cadillacs": nominated
2014: Video of the Year – "See You Again": won
Female Video of the Year – "See You Again": nominated
2015: Video of the Year – "Something' in the Water": won
Video of the Year – "Somethin' Bad" : nominated
Female Video of the Year – "Something in the Water": won
Female Video of the Year – "Little Toy Guns": nominated
Collaborative Video of the Year – "Somethin' Bad" : won
2016: Video of the Year – "Smoke Break": nominated
Female Video of the Year: – "Smoke Break": won
2017: Video of the Year – "Church Bells": nominated
Female Video of the Year – "Church Bells": won
Collaborative Video of the Year – "The Fighter" : won
2018: Video of the Year – "The Champion" : nominated 
Female Video of the Year – "The Champion" : won
Collaborative Video of the Year – "The Champion" : nominated 
CMT Performance of the Year – "The Fighter" : nominated 
2019: Video of the Year – "Cry Pretty": won
Female Video of the Year – "Love Wins": won
2020: Video of the Year – "Drinking Alone": won
Female Video of the Year – "Drinking Alone": won
2021: Video of the Year – "Hallelujah" : won
Collaborative Video of the Year – "Hallelujah" : nominated  
2022: Video of the Year – "If I Didn't Love You" : won
Collaborative of the Year – "If I Didn't Love You" : won
Canadian Country Music Awards
2006: SOCAN Song of the Year – "Jesus Take The Wheel" won
Country Music Association Awards
2006: Horizon Award: won
Female Vocalist of the Year: won
2007: Female Vocalist of the Year: won
Single of the Year – "Before He Cheats": won
Music Video of the Year – "Before He Cheats": nominated
Song Of The Year – "Before He Cheats": nominated
2008: Female Vocalist of the Year: won
Album of the Year – Carnival Ride: nominated
2009: Female Vocalist of the Year: nominated
Musical Event of the Year for – "I Told You So" : nominated
2011: Female Vocalist of the Year: nominated
2012: Female Vocalist of the Year: nominated
2013: Female Vocalist of the Year: nominated
Album of the Year – Blown Away: nominated
Music Video of the Year – "Blown Away": nominated
2014: Female Vocalist of the Year: nominated
Vocal Event of  the Year – "Somethin' Bad" : nominated
Music Video of the Year – "Somethin' Bad" : nominated
2015: Female Vocalist of the Year: nominated
2016: Entertainer of the Year: nominated
Female Vocaliat of the Year: won
Album of the Year – Storyteller: nominated 
2017: Female Vocalist of the Year: nominated
2018: Female Vocalist of the Year: won
Music Video of the a Year: "Cry Pretty": nominated
2019: Entertainer of the Year: nominated 
Female Vocalist of the Year: nominated 
Album of the Year – Cry Pretty: nominated 
2020: Entertainer of the Year: nominated  
Female Vocalist of the Year: nominated 
2021: Entertainer of the Year: nominated  
2022: Entertainer of the Year: pending 
Female Vocalist of the Year: pending
Musical Event of the Year – "If I Didn't Love You" : pending
GMA Dove Awards 
2006: Country Recorded Song of the Year – "Jesus, Take the Wheel": won
2021: Bluegrass/Country/Roots Albums – My Savior: nominated 
Inspirational Record Song of the Year – "Great is Thy Faithfulness" : won
Golden Globes
2011: Best Original Song – "There's a Place for Us" : nominated
Grammy Awards
2007: Best New Artist: won
Best Female Country Vocal Performance – "Jesus, Take the Wheel": won
2008: Best Female Country Vocal Performance – "Before He Cheats": won
Best Country Collaboration – "Oh Love": nominated
2009: Best Female Country Vocal Performance – "Last Name": won
2010: Best Female Country Vocal Performance – "Just A Dream": nominated
Best Country Collaboration with Vocals – "I Told You So" : won
2011: Best Female Country Vocal Performance – "Temporary Home": nominated
2012: Best Country Solo Performance – "Mama's Song": nominated
2013: Best Country Solo Performance – "Blown Away": won
2015: Best Country Solo Performance – "Something in the Water": won
Best Country Duo/Group Performance – "Somethin' Bad" : nominated
2016: Best Country Solo Performance – "Little Toy Guns": nominated
2017: Best Country Solo Performance – "Church Bells": nominated
2022: Best Roots Gospel Album – My Savior: won
Best Country Duo or Group Performance – "If I Didn't Love You" (with Jason Aldean): nominated 
iHeartRadio Music Awards
2016: Country Artist of the Year: nominated
2017: Country Artist of the Year: nominated 
Country Song of the Year – "Church Bells": nominated 
2019: Country Artist of the Year: nominated 
2022: Country Song of the Year – "If I Didn't Love You" : won
Best Collaboration – "If I Didn't Love You" : nominated 
2023: Country Artist of the Year: pending 
Best Tour Style: pending 
Best Residency: Reflection: The Las Vegas Residency: pending 
MTV Movie & TV Awards
2022: Best Musical Moment – "The Moment of Truth" from Cobra Kai: nominated 
MTV Video Music Awards
2007: Best New Artist – "Before He Cheats": nominated
People's Choice Awards
2007: Favorite Female Performer: won
Favorite Country Song – "Before He Cheats", won
2009: Favorite Female Artist: nominated
Favorite Country Artist: won
Favorite Star – 35 Under: won
Favorite Female Performer: won
Favorite Country Song – "Last Name": won
2010: Favorite Female Artist: nominated
Favorite Country Artist: won
2013: Favorite Country Artist: nominated
Favorite Album – Blown Away: nominated
Favorite Female Artist: nominated
2014: Favorite Female Country Artist: nominated
2015: Favorite Female Country Artist: won
2016: Favorite Female Country Artist: won
2017: Favorite Female Country Artist: won
2018: Female Artist: nominated 
2018: Country Artist: nominated 
2019: Country Artist: nominated  
2021: Country Artist: nominated  
2022: Country Artist: won
Teen Choice Awards
2005: Choice Summer Song – "Inside Your Heaven": nominated
Choice Female Reality/Variety Star for American Idol: won
2006: Choice Female Breakout Artist: nominated
Choice Female Artist: nominated
2007: Choice Music Payback – "Before He Cheats": nominated
Choice Female Artist: nominated
2008: Choice Red Carpet Female Icon: won
2009: Choice Female Artist Album – Carnival Ride: nominated
2010: Choice American Idol Alum: nominated
Choice Music: Country Song – "Undo It": nominated
Choice Music: Country Album – Play On: nominated
Choice Female Country Artist: nominated
2012: Choice Female Country Artist: nominated
2013: Choice Female Country Artist: nominated
2014: Choice Female Country Artist: nominated
Choice Music: Country Song – "Somethin' Bad" : nominated
2015: Choice Music: Country Artist: won
Choice Music: Country Song – "Little Toy Guns": won'
2016: Choice Music: Country Artist: won
2017: Choice Music: Country Artist: won
2017: Choice Music: Country Song – "The Fighter" : nominated
2018: Choice Music: Country Artist: won
2018: Choice Music: County Song – "Cry Pretty": nominated 
World Music Awards
2006: World's Best-Selling New Artist: nominated

Constantine Maroulis
Tony Awards
2009: Best Performance by a Leading Actor in a Musical: Rock of Ages: nominated

Season 5

Taylor Hicks
Billboard Awards
2006: Top Hot 100 Single Sales ("Do I Make You Proud/Takin It to the Streets")
Teen Choice Awards
2006: Choice Male Breakout Artist": nominated

Katharine McPhee
Teen Choice Awards
2006: Choice Breakout Female Artist: nominated
2007: Choice Breakout Female Artist: nominated
2012: Choice Breakout TV Star – Smash: nominated
Young Hollywood Awards
2007: Exciting New Vocalist: won

Chris Daughtry/Daughtry

American Music Awards
2007: Favorite Adult Contemporary Artist: won
Favorite Pop/Rock Album – Daughtry: Won
Favorite Breakthrough Artist: won
Fan Choice Award: nominated
2008: Favorite Pop/Rock Duo or Group: Winner
Favorite Adult Contemporary Artist: nominated
2009: Favorite Adult Contemporary Artist: nominated
Billboard Awards
2007: Top Pop Duo or Group: won
Top Pop New Artist: won
Hot 100 Duo or Group: won
Top Billboard 200 Album – Daughtry (album): won
Top Billboard 200 Artist: won
Top Billboard 200 Duo or Group: won
Kids Choice Awards
2009: Favorite Band: nominated
Grammy Awards
2008: Best Rock Album – Daughtry: nominated
Best Rock Song – "It's Not Over": nominated
Best Rock Performance by a Duo or Group – "It's Not Over": nominated
Best Pop Performance by a Duo or Group – "Home": nominated
MTV Video Music Awards
2007: Monster Single of the Year – "Home": nominated
People's Choice Awards
2007: Best Rock Song – "Home": won
2010: Best Rock Group: nominated
Teen Choice Awards
2007: Choice Breakout Group: nominated
Choice Rock Track – "It's Not Over": nominated
World Music Awards
2007, Worlds Best Selling Rock Group Of 2007: won
Worlds Best Selling New Artist Of 2007: won

Kellie Pickler

Academy of Country Music
2007: New Female Vocalist: nominated
2008: New Female Vocalist: nominated
American Country Awards
2013: Female Video of the Year – "Someone Somewhere Tonight": nominated
ASCAP Awards
2007: Songwriter Award – "Red High Heels": won
2008: Songwriter Award – "I Wonder": won
CMT Music Awards
2007: Breakthrough Video of the Year – "Red High Heels": nominated
2008: Best Performance – "I Wonder" CMT Music Awards USA Weekend Breakthrough Video of the Year: won
Best Tearjerker Video  – "I Wonder": won
Best Performance – "I Wonder" @ CMA Awards: won
2009: Female Video of the Year – "Don't You Know You're Beautiful": nominated
Country Music Association Awards
2007: Horizon Award: nominated
2008: New Artist of the Year: nominated
ASCAP Awards
2007: Songwriter Award – "Red High Heels": won
2008: Songwriter Award – "I Wonder": won
Daytime Emmy Award
2018: Outstanding Informative Talk Show Host – Picker & Ben: nominated
Teen Choice Awards
2011: Choice Female Country Artist: nominated
2012: Choice Female Country Artist: nominated

Ace Young
Grammy Awards
2008: Best Rock Song – "It's Not Over" : nominated

Mandisa
Grammy Awards
2008: Best Pop/Contemporary Gospel Album – True Beauty: nominated
2010: Best Pop/Contemporary Gospel Album – Freedom: nominated
2012: Best Contemporary Christian Music Album – What If We Were Real: nominated
2014: 
Best Gospel/Contemporary Christian Music Performance – Overcomer: nominated
Best Contemporary Christian Music Album – Overcomer: won

Season 6

Jordin Sparks

American Music Awards
2008: Favorite Adult Contemporary Artist: won
BET Awards
2008: Viewer's Choice – "No Air": nominated
Best Heartbreak Video – "No Air" : Won
Grammy Awards
2009: Best Pop Collaboration With Vocals – "No Air" : nominated
Image Awards
2008: Outstanding New Artist: won
2009: Outstanding Duo or Group/ Collaboration: nominated
MTV Video Music Awards
2008: Best Female Video – "No Air": nominated
Best New Artist – "No Air": nominated
MTV Australia Awards
2009: Best Collaboration for "No Air": nominated
People's Choice Awards
2008: Favorite Combined Forces for "No Air" : won
Favorite Pop Song for "No Air": nominated
Teen Choice Awards
2007: Choice Female Reality/Variety Star for American Idol: nominated
2008: Choice Hook Up Song – "No Air": won
Choice Breakthrough Artist: nominated
Choice Love Song – "No Air": nominated

Sanjaya Malakar
Teen Choice Awards
2007: Choice Male Reality/Variety Star for American Idol:  won

Season 7

David Cook

ASCAP Pop Awards
2010: Most Performed Songs of The Year Award: "Light On": won
Teen Choice Awards
2008: Choice Male Reality/Variety Star for American Idol: won
2009: Choice Male Artist Album – David Cook:  nominated
Choice Breakout Artist: nominated
The New Music Awards
2008: Top 40 Male Artist of the Year: won
Nashville Music Awards
2009: Song of the Year – "Time of My Life": won

David Archuleta
Alma Awards
2009: Music Rising Star: won
Teen Choice Awards
2008: Choice Summer Most Fanatic Fan: won
Choice Best Smile: won
2009: Choice Music Tour: won
Choice Breakout Artist: won
Choice Love Song – "Crush": won
2010: Choice American Idol Alum: won
Choice Most Fanatic Fan: nominated

Season 8

Kris Allen

Teen Choice Awards
2009: Choice Male Reality TV Star: nominated
Choice Summer Tour  :nominated
BMI London Music Awards
2010: Award-Winning Songs – "Live Like We're Dying": won
Billboard Music Award
2011: Top Christian Song – "Live Like We're Dying": nominated
BMI Pop Music Award
2011: Award-Winning Songs – "Live Like We're Dying": won
ASCAP Pop Music Award
2011: Award-Winning Songs – "Live Like We're Dying": won

Adam Lambert

All Headline News
2010: Top Live Act of 2010, 7th on list
Attitude Awards
2015: The Music Award: won
Barbara Walters' 10 Most Fascinating People
2009: Barbara Walters 10  Most Fascinating People of 2009, 7th on list
Billboard Year-End Chart Awards
2009: Top Artist: nominated
Top 200 Album – For Your Entertainment: nominated
Top Hot 100 Song – "Whataya Want From Me": nominated
Top Radio Song – "Whataya Want From Me": nominated
Top Digital Song – "Whataya Want From Me": nominated
Top Adult Contemporary Song – "Whataya Want From Me": nominated
Top Canadian Hot 100 Song – "Whataya Want From Me": nominated
Billboard.com Mid-Year Music Awards
2012: Best Style: nominated 
Best Music Video — "Never Close Our Eyes": nominated 
Favorite Billboard 200 No.1 Album – Trespassing: nominated 
Billboard Japan Music Awards
2009: Top Pop Artist: nominated
British LGBT Awards
2015: Music Icon Award: won
Music Artist: nominated 
2021: Celebrity: nominated 
BMI Pop Music Award
2011: Award-Winning Songs – "Whataya Want From Me": won
Bravo Otto Awards Germany
2011: Best International Artist: nominated
BT Digital Music Awards
2011" People's Choice Award for Best Fan Site for an Artist: nominated
Chinese Music Awards
2013: Favorite International Artist : won
Classic Rock Roll of Honour Awards
2014: Band of the Year : won
2017: Tour of the Year : won
CMA Wild and Young Awards Germany
2010: Best International Male Singer: won
2010: Best International Single – "Whataya Want From Me": won
CMT Music Awards
2016: CMT Peforamnce of the Year – "Girl Crush" : nominated
Do Something Awards
2011: Do Something Music Artist : nominated
2012: Do Something Music Artist: nominated 
Dorian Awards
2010: TV or Musical Comedy Performance of the Year: nominated
2019: TV Musical Performance of the Year: nominated 
EQCA Equality Awards
2011: Equality Idol Award: won
Flecking Records, UK
2010: Entertainer of the Year: won
Sexiest Male Celebrity: won
2011: Male Style Icon Of The Year: won
Male Twitterer Of The Year, won
Male Musician Of The Year, won
Male Star Of The Year, won
Good News Of The Year ("Whataya Want from Me" Grammy nomination): won
Fonogram Hungarian Music Awards
2011: International Modern Pop-Rock Album of the Year – For Your Entertainment: won
GLAAD Media Awards
2010: Outstanding Music Artist: nominated
Grammy Awards
2011: Best Male Pop Vocal Performance – "Whataya Want From Me": nominated
Hungarian Music Awards
2011: International Modern Pop/Rock Album of the Year – For Your Entertainment: won
2013: International Modern Pop/Rock Album of the Year – Trespassing: nominated 
2016: International Modern Pop/Rock Album of the Year – The Original High: nominated 
International Dance Music Awards
2010: Best Breakthrough Artist (solo) : nominated
iHeartRadio Music Awards
2016: Best Fan Army — Glamberts: nominated
Mashable Awards (Social Media)
2011: Must-Follow Musician on Social Media: nominated
MTV Video Music Awards Japan
2019: Best Male Video –  "Whataya Want From Me": nominated 
MTV O Music Awards
2011: Must Follow Artist on Twitter: won
Fan Army FTW: nominated
2012: Must Follow Artist on Twitter: nominated 
Fan Army FTW: nominated
MuchMusic Video Awards
2010: UR Fave International Video – "Whataya Want From Me": won
International Video Of The Year – Artist: nominated
NewNowNext Awards
2012: Super Fan Site www.adam-lambert.org: nominated
NRJ Radio Germany
2010: Best Song of 2010 – "Whataya Want from Me": won
O Music Awards
2011:Favorite F**k Yeah Tumblr : nominated
2011: Must Follow Artist on Twitter: nominated
2011: Fan Army FTW: nominated 
2012: Fan Army FTW: nominated 
2012: Must Follow Artist on Twitter: nominated 
2013: Fan Army FTW: nominated 
People's Choice Awards
2009: Breakthrough Artist: nominated
Teen Choice Awards
2009: Choice Reality Male Contestant for American Idol: won
Choice Red Carpet Male Icon: nominated
Choice Summer Tour : nominated
2010: Choice Music: Male Artist: nominated
Time Top 100 Poll of Most Influential People in the World
2009: Time Top 100 Poll, 90th on list
VH1 Do Something Awards
2011: Do Something Music Artist: nominated
Young Hollywood Awards
2009: Artist of the Year: won

Danny Gokey
Teen Choice Awards
2009; Choice Summer Tour : nominated
American Country Awards
2010: Breakthrough Artist of the Year: nominated
Grammy Awards
2018: Best Contemporary Christian Album – Rise: nom
2020: Best Contemporary Christian Album – Haven't Seen It Yet: pending

Allison Iraheta
Teen Choice Awards
2009: Choice Summer Tour : nominated

Matt Giraud
Teen Choice Awards
2009: Choice Summer Tour : nominated

Anoop Desai
Teen Choice Awards
2009: Choice Summer Tour : nominated

Lil Rounds
Teen Choice Awards
2009: Choice Summer Tour : *Nominated)

Scott MacIntyre
Teen Choice Awards
2009: Choice Summer Tour : nominated

Megan Joy
Teen Choice Awards
2009: Choice Summer Tour : nominated

Michael Sarver
Teen Choice Awards
2009: Choice Summer Tour : nominated

Season 9

Lee DeWyze
Teen Choice Awards
2010: Choice Male Reality TV Star for American Idol: won
Malibu Music Awards
2012: Best Album Award: won
Rock Alternative Award: won

Crystal Bowersox
Teen Choice Awards
2010: Choice TV: Female Reality/Variety Star for American Idol: nominated

Season 10

Scotty McCreery

ACM Awards
2012: Top New Solo Artist: won
American Country Awards
2011: Artist of the Year: New Artist: won
Billboard Music Awards
2012: Top New Artist: nominated
Top Country Album – Clear as Day: nominated
CMT Music Awards
2012: USA Weekend Breakthrough Video of the Year – "The Trouble With Girls": won
Music Row Awards
2012: Breakthrough Artist: nominated
Teen Choice Awards
2011: Choice Music Breakout Artist: nominated
2012: Choice Male Country Artist: nominated
Choice Male Reality TV Star for American Idol: nominated

Lauren Alaina

ACM Awards
2018: 
New Female Vocalist of the Year: won
Vocal Event of the Year – "What If’s" : nom
American Country Awards
2012: New Artist of the Year: won
Billboard Music Award
2018: Top Country Song – "What If’s" : nominated 
CMT Music Awards
2012: USA Weekend Breakthrough Video of the Year – "Like My Mother Does": nominated
2017: Breakthrough Video of the Year – "Road Less Traveled": won
2018:
Video of the Year – "What If’s" : Nominated
Female Video of the Year – "Doin’ Fine": nominated 
Collaborative Video of the Year – "What If’s" : won
Country Music Association Awards
2017: New Artist of the Year: nominated 
2018: New Artist of the Year: nominated
Golden Mic Awards
2018: Best Club Act: nominated 
Music Row Awards
2017: Breakthrough Artist Writ of the Year: won
Teen Choice Awards
2012: 
Choice Female Country Artist: nominated
Choice Female Reality TV Star: nominated
Inspirational Country Music Awards
2011: Inspirational Video – "Like My Mother Does": nominated
Radio Disney Music Awards
2017: Country Best New Artist: nominated

Season 11

Phillip Phillips

American Music Awards
2013: New Artist of the Year: nominated
Billboard Music Awards
2013: Top Rock Album – "The World From the Side of the Moon": nominated
Top Rock Song – "Home": nominated
World Music Awards
2012: World's Best Song "Home": nominated
2012: World's Best Male Artist: nominated
Teen Choice Awards
2012: Choice Love Song – "Home": nominated
Choice Breakout Artist: nominated
2013: Choice Male Artist: nominated
BMI Pop Music Award
2014: Award-Winning Songs – "Raging Fire": won

Colton Dixon
GMA Dove Awards
2013: New Artist of the Year: nominated
Best Rock/Contemporary Album of the Year – "A Messenger" : won
Best Rock/Contemporary Song of the Year – "You Are": nominated
2015: Best Rock/Contemporary Album of the Year – "Anchor": nominated

Season 14

Clark Beckham
Teen Choice Awards
2015: Choice Music: Next Big Thing: nominated

Season 16

Maddie Poppe
People's Choice Awards
2018: Competition Contestant of 2018: won

Gabby Barrett

Academy of Country Music Awards
2020: New Female Artist of the Year: nominated 
2021: New Female Artist of the Year: won
Single of the Year – "I Hope": nominated 
2022: Female Artist of the Year: pending 
American Music Awards
2021: Favorite Female Artist: nominated  
Favorite Country Album – Goldmine: won
Favorite Country Song – "The Good Ones": won
Billboard Music Awards
2021: Top New Artist: nominated 
Top Country Artist: nominated 
Top Female Country Artist: won
Top Hot 100 Song – "I Hope" (w/Charlie Puth): nominated 
Top Radio Song – "I Hope" (w/Charlie Puth): nominated 
Top Selling Song – "I Hope" (w/Charlie Puth): nominated 
Top Collaboration – "I Hope" (w/Charlie Puth): won
Top Country Song – "I Hope" (w/Charlie Puth): won
Top Country Album – Goldmine: nominated  
CMT Music Awards
2020: Breakthrough Video of the Year – "I Hope": won
2021: Female Video of the Year – "The Good Ones": won
2022: Female Video of the Year – "Footprints on the Moon": nominated 
CMA Awards
2020: New Artist of the Year: nominated  
Single of the Year – "I Hope": nominated
2021: New Artist of the Year: nominated 
Female Vocalist of the Year: nominated 
Single of the Year – "The Good Ones": nominated   
Song of the Year – "The Good Ones": nominated 
iHeartRadio Music Awards
2021: Country Song of the Year – "I Hope": nominated 
Best New Country Artist – won
Best Collaboration – "I Hope" (w/Charlie Puth): nominated
2022: Country Song of the Year – "The Good Ones": nominated

Season 20

Noah Thompson
People's Choice Awards
2022: Competition Contestant of 2022: pending

By major awards

Grammy Awards
Grammy Award notes:

Kelly Clarkson became the first Idol winner and alum to win a Grammy.
Clarkson & Ruben Studdard became the first Idol winners and alums to be nominated for a Grammy.
Most Grammy nominations: Kelly Clarkson, Carrie Underwood with 16.
Most Grammy wins: Carrie Underwood with 8.
Most Grammy-nominated season: season 5 (Chris Daughtry, Mandisa & Ace Young).
Clarkson, Studdard, Barrino, Underwood and Sparks are the only winners to be nominated for a Grammy.
Adam Lambert is the only runner-up to be nominated for a Grammy.
Clarkson, Hudson, and Mandisa are the only contestants to win a Grammy for an album
Clarkson was the first to have an album nominated for a Grammy and to win it.
Clarkson is the first to win a Grammy for an album more than once.
Clarkson is the first and only to have a song nominated for Record of the Year.
Underwood is the only contestant to be nominated for Best New Artist.
Underwood is the first and only alum to win a Big Four Grammy category – Best New Artist in 2007.
Underwood became the first alum to have a song nominated for Song of the Year.
Clarkson and Underwood are the only alums to have a song nominated for Song of the Year, though they themselves were not nominated, not being the songwriters.
Underwood is also the fastest alum to win a Grammy Award, 1 year and 4 months since the release of her debut album, Some Hearts.
Five of Clarkson's nine albums have been nominated for Best Pop Vocal Album. One of her albums is nominated for Best Traditional Pop Vocal album.
Clarkson, Hudson, and Underwood are the only Idol contestants to win more than one Grammy.
Barrino, Hudson, Daughtry, and Mandisa, earned Grammy nominations for their debut albums.
Studdard, Daughtry, Sparks, Young, Danny Gokey, and Lambert are the only ones who have been nominated and not win.
Eleven Idol alums have been nominated for Grammys. 
Total Grammy nominations earned by Idol contestants: sixty-six nominations, fourteen wins.

American Music Awards

Notes:
Clarkson was the first Idol alumni to be nominated for and win an AMA.
Carrie Underwood has won the most AMA's with fifteen. 
Underwood has been nominated the most with twenty-five.
Clarkson and Underwood are the only alums who have been nominated for and win Artist of the Year.
Clarkson, Underwood, Daughtry, and Barrett are the only ones who have had albums nominated. 
Underwood's first six albums have won Favorite Country Album.

Academy Awards
Jennifer Hudson is the only alum to be nominated for and win an Oscar.

BAFTA
Jennifer Hudson is the only alum to be nominated for and win a BAFTA.

Billboard Music Awards
Ruben Studdard and Clay Aiken were the first Idol alums to be nominated for a Billboard Music Award.
Studdard is the first winner to be nominated for a BMA.
Kelly Clarkson, Ruben Studdard, Fantasia Barrino, Carrie Underwood, Taylor Hicks, Kris Allen, Scotty McCreery and Phillip Phillips are the only winners to be nominated for a BMA.
Most nominations: Carrie Underwood with twenty-four.
Most wins: Carrie Underwood with eleven.
McCreery and Barrett are the only alums to be nominated for Top New Artist.
Clarkson is the only alum to be nominated for Artist of the Year.
Fifteen Idol alums have been nominated for a BMA.

Brit Awards
Kelly Clarkson is the only alum to be nominated for a Brit Award.

Emmy Awards
Emmy Awards notes:
Kelly Clarkson, Jennifer Hudson, Kellie Pickler are the only alums to be nominated for an Emmy.
Kellie Pickler was the first to be nominated for an Emmy.
Kelly Clarkson is the first and only winner to be nominated for an Emmy.
Clarkson is the first winner and alum to win an Emmy.
Clarkson and Hudson are the only alums to win an Emmy.
Clarkson has the most nominations with seven, and wins with five.

Daytime Emmy Award

Golden Globe Awards
Jennifer Hudson is the first alum to be nominated for a Golden Globe
Hudson and Carrie Underwood are the only alums to be nominated for a Golden Globe
Hudson is the only alum to win a Golden Globe.

NAACP Image Awards
Ruben Studdard is the first winner and alum to be nominated for and win an Image Award.
Studdard, Barrino and Sparks are the only winners to win an Image Award.
Jennifer Hudson has won the most Image Awards with eight.
Hudson has the most nominations with twenty-one.

Tony Awards
Jennifer Hudson is the first and only Idol alum to be nominated for and win a Tony Award.

Notes

References

American Idol
Awards